Jeremiah O'Donovan Rossa (baptised 4 September 1831, died 29 June 1915) was an Irish Fenian leader and member of the Irish Republican Brotherhood.

Born and raised in Rosscarbery, West Cork of County Cork in the South of Ireland during the Great Irish Famine, O'Donovan founded the Phoenix National and Literary Society and dedicated his life to working towards the establishment of an independent Irish Republic. He joined the Irish Republican Brotherhood and after fleeing to the United States as part of the Cuba Five, he joined Irish revolutionary organisations there, beyond the reach of the British Empire. He was a pioneer in physical force Irish republicanism utilising dynamite in a campaign of asymmetrical warfare, hitting the British Empire on its home territory, primarily London.

Biography

Life in Ireland
Jeremiah O'Donovan Rossa was born Jeremiah Donovan in the townland of Reanascreena, Rosscarbery, County Cork, to Denis Donovan and Ellen Driscol, and was baptised on 4 September 1831. His parents were tenant farmers. According to the scholar John O'Donovan, with whom Rossa corresponded, Rossa's ancestors belonged to the obscure but ancient sliocht of the MacEnesles or Clan Aneslis O'Donovans. His ancestors had held letters patent in Kilmeen parish in the 17th century before the confiscations, with his agnomen "Rossa" coming from the townland of Rossmore in Kilmeen. So Jeremiah adopted the surname, Rossa.

Rossa became a shopkeeper in Skibbereen, where, in 1856, he established the Phoenix National and Literary Society, the aim of which was "the liberation of Ireland by force of arms", This organisation would later merge with the Irish Republican Brotherhood (IRB), founded two years later in Dublin.

In December 1858, he was arrested and jailed without trial until July 1859. In 1863 he became the business manager of James Stephens' newspaper, The Irish People which was raided and suppressed in September 1865. As part of the raid, Rossa was arrested and held at Richmond Bridewell prison to await trial by Special Commission on charges of treason felony. Fanny Parnell, co-founder of the Ladies' Land League with her sister Anna Parnell attended the trial which was thought to have influenced her thinking. He was sentenced to penal servitude for life due to his previous convictions. He served his time in Pentonville, Portland, Millbank and Chatham prisons in England.

Rossa was a defiant prisoner, manacled for 35 straight days for throwing a chamber pot at the prison's warden and thrown into solitary confinement on a bread-and-water diet for three days for refusing to take off his cap in front of the prison's doctor. For most of his time in prison Rossa was denied the right to correspond with his associates in the outside world because of his violation of prison rules.

In an 1869 by-election, he was returned to the British House of Commons for the Tipperary constituency, in which he defeated the Liberal Catholic Denis Caulfield Heron by 1054 to 898 votes. The election was declared invalid because Rossa was an imprisoned felon.

Life in the United States

After giving an understanding that he would not return to Ireland, in effect his exile, O'Donovan Rossa was released as part of the Fenian Amnesty of 1870. Boarding the ship SS Cuba, he left for the United States with his friend John Devoy and three other exiles. Together they were dubbed "The Cuba Five".

O'Donovan Rossa took up residence in New York City, where he joined Clan na Gael and the Fenian Brotherhood. Rossa additionally established his own newspaper dedicated to the cause of Irish national liberation from British rule, The United Irishman. In it Rossa advocated the terroristic use of dynamite bombs as a means of overthrowing the British occupation. His paper was used to raise a so-called "resources for civilisation fund," presumably for the purchase of dynamite and other armaments for the Irish struggle.

Rossa organised the first ever bombings by Irish republicans of English cities in what was called the "dynamite campaign". The campaign lasted through the 1880s and made him infamous in Britain. The British government demanded his extradition from America, but without success. Rossa later justified his revolutionary activities in the following manner;

On 2 February 1885, Rossa was shot outside his office near Broadway by an Englishwoman, Lucille Yseult Dudley. He was admitted to the Chamers Street Hospital with gunshot wounds to the back. Even though they were not life-threatening, a ball was to remain embedded there for the rest of his life. "I've been wounded in the war" was Rossa's comment to a friend in the hospital. The British government claimed she was mentally unstable, and not acting on its behalf, although Rossa's supporters and even many of his detractors found this hard to believe. More likely, she was incensed at the fund he organised (the so-called "Skirmishing Fund") which was intended to support the arming of those who would fight the British.

Rossa was allowed to visit Ireland in 1894, and again in 1904. On the latter visit, he was made a "Freeman of the City of Cork."

Family

O'Donovan Rossa was married three times and had eighteen children. On 6 June 1853, he married Honora Eager of Skibbereen, who had four sons (Denis, John, Cornelius Crom and Jeremiah). She died in 1860. In 1861 he married Ellen Buckley of Castlehaven; they had one son (Florence Stephens; later known as Timothy in the US); Buckley died in July 1863. In November 1864 he married, for the third time, to Mary Jane (Molly) Irwin of Clonakilty. They had thirteen children (James Maxwell, Kate Ellen, Francis Daniel, Maurice, Sheila Mary, Eileen Ellen, Amelia, Jeremiah, Isabella, Mary Jane, Margaret Mary Hamilton, Joseph Ivor and Alexander Aeneas).

O'Dovonan Rossa's great-great grandson is US international rugby union player John Quill.

Death and funeral

Rossa was seriously ill in his later years, and was finally confined to a hospital bed in St. Vincent's Hospital, Staten Island, where he died at the age of 83.

The new republican movement in Ireland was quick to realise the propaganda value of the old Fenian's death, and Tom Clarke cabled to John Devoy the message: "Send his body home at once".

His body was returned to Ireland for burial and a hero's welcome. The funeral at Glasnevin Cemetery on 1 August 1915 was a huge affair, garnering substantial publicity for the Irish Volunteers and the IRB at time when a rebellion (later to emerge as the Easter Rising) was being actively planned. The graveside oration, given by Patrick Pearse, remains one of the most famous speeches of the Irish independence movement stirring his audience to a call to arms. It ended with the lines:

They think that they have pacified Ireland. They think that they have purchased half of us and intimidated the other half. They think that they have foreseen everything, think that they have provided against everything; but, the fools, the fools, the fools! — They have left us our Fenian dead, and while Ireland holds these graves, Ireland unfree shall never be at peace.

His grave was renovated in 1990 by the National Graves Association.

Legacy

A memorial to O'Donovan Rossa stands in St. Stephen's Green, and a bridge over the River Liffey was renamed in his honour. A street in Cork City bears his name, as does a street in Thurles, Co. Tipperary – the constituency where he was elected. A park in Skibbereen is also named after him as is the local Gaelic football team.

A memorial to O'Donovan Rossa stands in the village of Reenascreena, Rosscarbery Co Cork where his descendants run the local village pub. The funeral casket that was used to ship him home is now on display next to the pub.

Other GAA teams throughout Ireland have also been named after him including Ard Bó Uí Dhonnabhain Rossa in the Tyrone GAA, O'Donovan Rossa GAC in Belfast, Ó Donnabháin Rosa Magherafelt in the Derry GAA and Uí Donnabháin Rosa Mullach Breac in Armagh GAA along with Ó Donnabháin Rosa est. in 2018 in Astoria, Queens, New York.

The descendants of Jeremiah O'Donovan Rossa made their homes in Staten Island; they include writer William Rossa Cole and New York City Councillor Jerome X. O'Donovan.

In popular culture
In James Joyce's "Araby," written between 1905 and 1907, the narrator is walking across Dublin, when he hears "the nasal chanting of street-singers, who sang a come-all-you about O'Donovan Rossa".

Rossa appears as a character in Harry Harrison's alternate history Stars and Stripes trilogy.

Works

 O'Donovan Rossa's Prison Life : Six Years in Six English Prisons (1874: New York)
 Rossa's Recollections. 1838 to 1898. (1898: New York).
 Irish Rebels in English Prisons : A Record of Prison Life (1899: New York)

Republications

 Rossa's Recollections 1838 to 1898: Memoirs of an Irish Revolutionary (Globe Pequot, 2004)

Further reading
 McWilliams, Patrick, O'Donovan Rossa: An Irish Revolutionary in America. Catalonia. Nuascéalta (2016). .
 Kenna, Shane, Unrepentant Fenian: Jeremiah O'Donovan Rossa. Dublin (2015). 
 Whelehan, Niall, The Dynamiters: Political Violence and Irish Nationalism in the Wider World 1867–1900. Cambridge (2012).
 Ó Lúing, Seán, Ó Donnabháin Rosa two Vols. Dublin (1969).
 Malins, Edward, 'Yeats and the Easter Rising', in L Miller (ed.), Yeats Centenary Papers. Dublin (1965).
 Le Roux, Louis, Patrick H. Pearse (tr. Desmond Ryan). Dublin (1932).
 Papers relating to O'Donovan Rossa and the Fenians are housed in the Archives of The Catholic University of America, American Catholic History Research Center and University Archives, Washington, D.C.

See also

Fenian Rising
List of people on stamps of Ireland
O'Donovan

References

External links

 
myguideIreland page with additional information on Rossa

People of the Fenian dynamite campaign
1831 births
1915 deaths
19th-century Irish people
Burials at Glasnevin Cemetery
Irish prisoners and detainees
Irish emigrants to the United States (before 1923)
Irish exiles
Members of the Irish Republican Brotherhood
Members of the Parliament of the United Kingdom for County Tipperary constituencies (1801–1922)
Jeremiah
People from Rosscarbery
People from Skibbereen
Prisoners and detainees of the United Kingdom
UK MPs 1868–1874